Elections to Angus Council were held on 4 May 2017, the same day as the other Scottish local government elections. The election used the eight wards, created under the Local Governance (Scotland) Act 2004, with each ward electing three or four councillors using the single transferable vote system, form of proportional representation. A total of 28 councillors were elected, one less than in 2012.

Following the 2012 election the Scottish National Party formed the administration on the Council. Cllr Ian Gaul (Kirriemuir and Dean) was appointed Leader of the Council at the subsequent statutory meeting; Cllr Paul Valentine (Montrose) became Depute Leader; and Cllr Helen Oswald (Carnoustie and District) was elected Provost.

Election result

Note: "Votes" are the first preference votes. The net gain/loss and percentage changes relate to the result of the previous Scottish local elections on 3 May 2012. This may differ from other published sources showing gain/loss relative to seats held at dissolution of Scotland's councils.

Ward results

Kirriemuir and Dean
2012: 2 x SNP, 1 x Conservative
2017: 2 x Conservative, 1 x SNP
2012-2017 Change: 1 x Conservative gain from SNP

Brechin and Edzell
2012: 2 x SNP, 1 x Independent
2017: 1 x SNP, 1 x Independent, 1 x Conservative
2012-2017 Change: 1 x Conservative gain from SNP

*Disendorsed by the SNP prior to polling day, but appeared on ballot paper as SNP candidate.

Forfar and District
2012: 2 x SNP, 2 x Independent
2017: 2 x Independent, 1 x SNP, 1 x Conservative
2012-2017 Change: 1 x Conservative gain from SNP

Monifieth and Sidlaw
2012: 2 x SNP, 1 x Conservative, 1 x Labour
2017: 2 x SNP, 1 x Conservative 1 x Liberal Democrat
2012-2017 Change: 1 x Liberal Democrat gain from Labour

Carnoustie and District
2012: 2 x Independent, 1 x SNP
2017: 2 x Independent, 1 x SNP
2012-2017 Change: No Change

Arbroath West, Letham and Friockheim
2012: 2 x SNP, 1 x Conservative, 1 x Independent
2017: 1 x SNP, 1 x Conservative, 1 x Independent, 1 x Liberal Democrat
2012-2017 Change: 1 X Liberal Democrat gain from SNP

* Sitting Councillor for Arbroath East and Lunan Ward.

Arbroath East and Lunan
2012: 2 x SNP, 1 x Independent, 1 x Conservative
2017: 1 x Conservative, 1 x Independent, 1 x SNP
2012-2017 Change: 1 x SNP loss due to there being one less seat than 2012.

Montrose and District
2012: 2 x SNP, 1 x Independent, 1 x Liberal Democrat
2017: 1 x SNP, 1 x Conservative, 2 x Independent
2012-2017 Change:1 x Conservative gain from SNP, 1 x Independent gain from Liberal Democrats

References

External links
list of persons nominated

2017 Scottish local elections
2017